Uziel Muñoz Galarza (born 8 September 1995) is a Mexican athlete specialising in the shot put. He won bronze medals at the 2019 Summer Universiade and 2019 Pan American Games.

Born in Nuevo Casas Grandes, his personal bests in the event are 20.86 metres outdoors (Chihuahua 2019) and 19.67 metres indoors (Albuquerque 2019).

Personal bests
Shot put (outdoor): 21.06 m –  Havana, Cuba, 19 Jun 2022
Shot put (indoor): 19.67 m –  Albuquerque, USA, 26 Jan 2019

International competitions

References

1995 births
Living people
Mexican male shot putters
Competitors at the 2018 Central American and Caribbean Games
Athletes (track and field) at the 2019 Pan American Games
Pan American Games medalists in athletics (track and field)
Pan American Games bronze medalists for Mexico
Universiade bronze medalists for Mexico
Universiade medalists in athletics (track and field)
Medalists at the 2019 Summer Universiade
Medalists at the 2019 Pan American Games
Sportspeople from Chihuahua (state)
People from Nuevo Casas Grandes Municipality
21st-century Mexican people